
Biotechnology is a technology based on biology, especially when used in agriculture, food science, and medicine.

Of the many different definitions available, the one formulated by the UN Convention on Biological Diversity is one of the broadest:

"Biotechnology means any technological application that uses biological systems, living organisms, or derivatives thereof, to make or modify products or processes for specific use." (Article 2. Use of Terms)

More about Biotechnology...

This page provides an alphabetical list of articles and other pages (including categories, lists, etc.) about biotechnology.

A

Agrobacterium -- Affymetrix -- Alcoholic beverages -- :Category:Alcoholic beverages -- Amgen -- Antibiotic -- Artificial selection

B

Biochemical engineering -- Biochip -- Biodiesel -- Bioengineering -- Biofuel -- Biogas -- Biogen Idec -- Bioindicator -- Bioinformatics -- :Category:Bioinformatics -- Bioleaching -- Biological agent -- Biological warfare -- Bioluminescence -- Biomimetics -- Bionanotechnology -- Bionics --Biopharmacology -- Biophotonics -- Bioreactor -- Bioremediation -- Biostimulation -- Biosynthesis -- Biotechnology -- :Category:Biotechnology -- :Category:Biotechnology companies -- :Category:Biotechnology products -- Bt corn

C

Cancer immunotherapy -- Cell therapy -- Chimera (genetics) -- Chinese hamster -- Chinese Hamster Ovary cell -- Chiron Corp. -- Cloning -- Compost -- Composting -- Convention on Biological Diversity -- Chromatography

D

Directive on the patentability of biotechnological inventions -- DNA microarray -- Dwarfing

E
Enzymes -- Electroporation -- Environmental biotechnology -- Eugenics

F

Fermentation -- :Category:Fermented foods

G

Gene knockout -- Gene therapy -- Genentech -- Genetic engineering -- Genetically modified crops --Genetically modified food -- Genetically modified food controversies -- Genetically modified organisms -- Genetics -- Genomics -- Genzyme -- Global Knowledge Center on Crop Biotechnology - Glycomics -- Golden rice -- Green fluorescent protein

H

Human cloning -- Human Genome Project

I

Immunotherapy -- Immune suppression -- Industrial biotechnology -- Interactomics

J

L
locon
Lipidomics

M

MedImmune -- Metabolic engineering -- Metabolomics -- Metagenomics --  Microbial Fuel Cell -- Microfluidics -- Millennium Pharmaceuticals -- Monoclonal antibodies -- Mycofiltration -- Mycoremediation

N

Nanobiotechnology

O

Omics

P
Phosphatases -- Pfizer Inc. -- Phage therapy -- Pharmacogenomics -- Pharming (genetics) -- Plant-made pharmaceuticals -- Plantibody -- Proteomics

Q

R

Recombinant DNA -- Regulation of the release of genetic modified organisms -- Reporter gene

S

Selective breeding -- Serono -- Shotgun sequencing -- Stem cell -- STR multiplex systems -- Sustainability -- Sustainable development

T

Terminator technology -- Transcriptomics -- Transgenic animal -- Transgenic plants -- Transgenic plant production

U

Use of biotechnology in pharmaceutical manufacturing

V
Vaccine -- Virology

W

X

Xenotransplantation

Y

Z
Zoology